Where's Rose is a 2021 American folk horror thriller film directed by John Mathis, starring Ty Simpkins, Skyler Elyse Philpot, Annelise Judge, Kathy Searle, Nick Basta and Joseph Gray.

Cast
 Ty Simpkins as Eric Daniels
 Skyler Elyse Philpot as Rose Daniels
 Annelise Judge as Jessica Waters
 Kathy Searle as Mary Daniels
 Nick Basta as Nate Daniels
 Joseph Gray as Dan Waters

Release
The film was released in theatres on 29 July 2022, and was released to VOD on 30 August.

Reception
David Gelmini of Dread Central rated the film 4 stars out of 5, calling it "a haunting and challenging viewing experience which will make you wish your loved ones will never return after they get lost in the woods."

Paul Risker of PopMatters gave the film a rating of 6/10. Rich Cross of Starburst rated the film 2 stars out of 5, writing that "The closing scenes of Where’s Rose do deliver some powerful revelations. Yet there’s a nastiness to those narrative twists that feel out of kilter with the film’s otherwise bland tone, while the muddled folklore falls flat."

References

External links
 
 

American horror thriller films
2022 horror thriller films
Folk horror films